is a 1968 Japanese satiric anti-war film about a soldier who becomes assigned to a suicide mission against the US Forces during the late stage of World War II. It was written and directed by Kihachi Okamoto.

Plot
During the last days of the war, a nameless young cadet is assigned to a suicide mission, ordered to blow himself up with an ammunition crate under the expected enemy tanks. While awaiting the enemy's invasion, he makes the acquaintance of a young orphaned woman, who runs a brothel formerly owned by her parents, and two kid brothers. He falls in love with the young woman, who is later killed in an air raid, as is the elder of the brothers. Vowing revenge for the dead, he receives new orders from the deteriorating commanding staff, ordering him to manually steer a torpedo into the awaited enemy battleships. Twenty years after the war has ended, his skeletal remains float in an oil drum off the beach, his offscreen voice shouting "rabbit", the nickname he had given the girl.

Cast
 Minori Terada – Him
 Naoko Otani – Girl
 Chishū Ryū – Bookstore owner
 Tanie Kitabayashi – Bookstore owner's wife
 Shoichi Ozawa – Sergeant
 Kin Sugai – Sergeant's mistress
 Etsushi Takahashi – NCO
 Ichirō Nakatani – Military policeman
 Kunie Tanaka – Captain
 Masumi Harukawa – Woman in apron
 Yūnosuke Itō – Ship captain
 Hideyo Amamoto – Father

Production
After negotiations with Toho Studios failed, Okamoto financed The Human Bullet himself, shooting it on 16mm film (to be later released in 35 mm format). Independent distribution and production company Art Theatre Guild acted as co-producer.

Awards
The Human Bullet received the 1968 Mainichi Film Awards for Best Direction, Best Actor (Minori Terada), Best Music and Best Art Direction (Isao Akune).

Notes

References

External links
 
 

Japanese war films
Films directed by Kihachi Okamoto
1968 films
Films scored by Masaru Sato
Pacific War films
1968 war films
Japanese World War II films
1960s Japanese films
1960s Japanese-language films